Symplocos junghuhnii is a species of plant in the family Symplocaceae. It is a tree endemic to Java in Indonesia. It is threatened by habitat loss.

References

junghuhnii
Endemic flora of Java
Endangered plants
Taxonomy articles created by Polbot